Daphne Maureen May Robinson (16 February 1932 – 7 February 2008) was a New Zealand cricketer who played as a right-arm medium bowler and left-handed batter. She appeared in one Test match for New Zealand in 1961. She played domestic cricket for Otago.

References

External links

1932 births
2008 deaths
Cricketers from Dunedin
New Zealand women cricketers
New Zealand women Test cricketers
Otago Sparks cricketers